The 2010 Missouri Valley Conference men's soccer season was the 20th season of men's varsity soccer in the conference.

The 2010 Missouri Valley Conference Men's Soccer Tournament was hosted and won by Bradley.

Teams

MVC Tournament

See also 

 Missouri Valley Conference
 Missouri Valley Conference men's soccer tournament
 2010 NCAA Division I men's soccer season
 2010 in American soccer

References 

Missouri Valley Conference
2010 NCAA Division I men's soccer season